Zehner is an unincorporated community in the rural municipality of Edenwold No. 158, Saskatchewan in Saskatchewan. This community is approximately 19 km (12 miles) northeast of Regina. It is also the administrative headquarters of the Piapot Cree First Nation band government.

History  
A post office was established in 1901 under the name of Arat. In 1914 the name was changed to Zehner.

Climate

References 

Edenwold No. 158, Saskatchewan
Unincorporated communities in Saskatchewan
Piapot Cree Nation
Division No. 6, Saskatchewan